Pier 35 may refer to:

Pier 35 (San Francisco), USA
Pier 35 (Manhattan), New York City, USA
Pier 35 (Port Melbourne), Australia